Johnny Depp is an American actor, producer and musician. He has appeared in films, television series and video games. He made his film debut in the horror film A Nightmare on Elm Street in 1984. In the two following years, Depp appeared in the comedy Private Resort (1985), the war film Platoon (1986), and Slow Burn (1986). A year later, he started playing his recurring role as Officer Tom Hanson in the police procedural television series 21 Jump Street (1987–1990) which he played until the middle of season 4, and during this time, he experienced a rapid rise as a professional actor.

In 1990, he starred as the title characters in the films Cry-Baby and Edward Scissorhands. Throughout the rest of the decade, Depp portrayed lead roles in Arizona Dream (1993), What's Eating Gilbert Grape (1993), Benny & Joon (1993), Dead Man (1995) and title characters Ed Wood (1994), Don Juan DeMarco (1995), and Donnie Brasco (1997). He also starred in Fear and Loathing in Las Vegas (1998) as Hunter S. Thompson, The Ninth Gate (1999) as Dean Corso, and Sleepy Hollow (1999) as Ichabod Crane.

In the early 2000s, he appeared in the romance Chocolat (2000), crime film Blow (2001), action film Once Upon a Time in Mexico (2003), drama Finding Neverland (2004), and horror films From Hell and Secret Window (2004). In addition, Depp portrayed the title character in Sweeney Todd: The Demon Barber of Fleet Street (2007) and appeared in Public Enemies (2009). In 2003, he portrayed Captain Jack Sparrow in the Pirates of the Caribbean series, starting with The Curse of the Black Pearl, and reprised the role in four sequels (2006–2017), becoming one of his most famous roles. For each performance in The Curse of the Black Pearl, Finding Neverland, and Sweeney Todd, Depp was nominated for an Academy Award for Best Actor. He also portrayed Willy Wonka and Tarrant Hightopp in the fantasy films Charlie and the Chocolate Factory (2005) and Alice in Wonderland which each garnered over $474 million and $1 billion at the box office, respectively.

In 2010, he went on to star in The Tourist with Angelina Jolie and was nominated for a Golden Globe Award for Best Actor in a Motion Picture Comedy. He starred in Dark Shadows (2012) with Michelle Pfeiffer, The Lone Ranger (2013) with Armie Hammer, and Transcendence (2014) with Morgan Freeman. He reprised his role as the Tarrant Hightopp in Alice Through the Looking Glass (2016) and starred in the drama Minamata (2020). Beginning in 2011, he has produced films through his company Infinitum Nihil. He has also lent his voice to the animated series King of the Hill in 2004, SpongeBob SquarePants in 2009, and Family Guy in 2012, in addition to the animated film Rango (2011). Moreover, Depp has appeared in many documentary films, mostly as himself.

Film

Television

Video games

Documentaries

See also
 List of awards and nominations received by Johnny Depp

References

External links
 
 

Depp, Johnny
Depp, Johnny
Depp, Johnny
Depp, Johnny
Filmography